Swainby with Allerthorpe is a civil parish in the Hambleton district of North Yorkshire, England. The population of the civil parish at the 2011 census was less than 100. Details are included in the civil parish of Carthorpe.

Civil parishes in North Yorkshire